Kirchheimbolanden, the capital of Donnersbergkreis, is a town in Rhineland-Palatinate, south-western Germany. It is situated approximately 25 km west of Worms, and 30 km north-east of Kaiserslautern. The first part of the name, Kirchheim, dates back to 774.  It became a town in 1368, and the Sponheim family improved its security with many towers and walls. William, Duke of Nassau, ancestor of the royal families of Belgium, Sweden, Denmark and Norway, and of the grand-ducal family of Luxembourg, was born in Kirchheimbolanden. It was also ruled by the First French Empire between 1792 and 1814, before passing to the Kingdom of Bavaria in 1815. It was a rural district centre in the Rheinkreis, which was renamed Pfalz (Palatinate) in 1835.

Geography

Location
Kirchheimbolanden lies in the Palatinate at the transition point of the Nordpfälzer Bergland to the Alzeyer Hügelland bordering to the east. The city centre is located about four kilometres (as the crow flies) northeast of Donnersberg on the slope of Wartberg, also known as Schillerhain. The Leiselsbach, a left tributary of the Pfrimm, rises in the urban area. The lowest point lies at 229 m above sea level, the highest at 496 m above sea level.

Elevation
The highest point of the district is the summit of the 502 meter high Eichelberg in the far west, further east the 430.7 meter high Kuhkopf extends. The development is on the slope of the Wartberg, alternatively called Schillerhain. In the northwest of the district rises the 399.7 meter high Albertskreuz and northwest of the settlement area the 354.1 meter high Steinkopf. The Hungerberg range of hills, up to 302 meters high, is located in the southeast.

Urban division
Kirchheimbolanden is divided into the city centre with the district Haide and the districts Ambach, Bolanderhof, Edenbornerhof, Hessenhütte, Neuhof, Rothenkircherhof and Schillerhain Further places of residence are railway station 2262, Brunnenberg, brickworks Ebert, Kohlhütte and Ziegelhütte.

History

Middle ages
The place Kirchheim was first mentioned in 774, later it belonged to the Lords of Bolanden. 

It is mentioned in the Wormser wall-building ordinance from around 900 as one of the places that shared responsibility for maintaining the city wall of Worms. At the end of the 13th century, Kirchheim was inherited by the Sponheim branch line Bolanden-Dannenfels. Count Heinrich II. Von Sponheim-Bolanden raised the village to a town in 1368 and made it his residence. Via his granddaughter Anna von Hohenlohe († 1410) and her husband Philipp I, Count of Nassau-Weilburg, Kirchheimbolanden and the entire Sponheim-Bolander family property finally fell to the Nassau House, which owned it until the end of the feudal period.

Early modern age
Charles August, Prince of Nassau-Weilburg moved his residence from Weilburg to Kirchheim in 1737. Charles Christian, Prince of Nassau-Weilburg temporarily owned his own infantry regiment (1755–1759) in Mannheim with the Elector of the Electoral Palatinate and was temporarily general of the Netherlands, where he was governor. Frederick William, Prince of Nassau-Weilburg (1788–1816) left the city in 1793 because of the French Revolution and went to Bayreuth. This ended the time as the royal seat for Kirchheimbolanden, then only called Kirchheim.

It experienced its greatest heyday under Prince Charles August (1719–1753) and especially under Carl Christian (1753–1788) of the House of Nassau-Weilburg and his rich, clever and musical wife Princess Carolina of Orange-Nassau.

From the 19th century
After 1792, French revolutionary troops occupied the region and after the Treaty of Campo Formio (1797), annexed the left bank of the Rhine. From 1798 to 1814, Kirchheim belonged to the French department of Donnersberg and was the main town (chef-lieu) of the canton of the same name.

Due to the agreements made at the Congress of Vienna (1815) and an exchange contract with Austria, the region became part of the Kingdom of Bavaria in 1816. From 1818, Kirchheim was the seat of a land commissioner in the Bavarian Rhine circle.

When the Rhenish Hessian Legion hurriedly evacuated Kirchheim from a Prussian overwhelming power during the Palatinate uprising on June 14, 1849, Palatine militants remained in the palace garden without notification. In the battle of Kirchheimbolanden in the presence of the Prince of Prussia, 17 militants were killed.

From 1939, the place was part of and administrative seat of the district of the same name. After the Second World War, Kirchheimbolanden became part of the then newly formed state of Rhineland-Palatinate, within the French occupation zone. In the course of the first Rhineland-Palatinate administrative reform, the city moved in 1969 to the newly formed Donnersbergkreis and its seat; three years later, Kirchheimbolanden was incorporated into the also newly created community of the same name.

Politics
The city council in Kirchheimbolanden consists of 24 council members, who were elected in a personalized proportional representation in the local elections on May 26, 2019, and the honorary city mayor as chairman.

The distribution of seats in the city council are:

 FWG = Free Voters City of Kirchheimbolanden e. V. (formerly voter group Schauß)

In 2019, the town gained international attention after Lisel Heise, a 100-year old former physical education teacher, ran for the local council and was elected.

City Mayor
The previous mayors of Kirchheimbolanden:

Coat of arms

Blazon: “Divided; at the top of silver and black sheathed in three rows, at the bottom in green a black boar striding to the right.“

Justification of the coat of arms: The coat of arms was awarded by King Ludwig I of Bavaria on January 30, 1844 and was last confirmed on June 18, 1976 by the district government, Neustadt an der Weinstrasse. It comes from a city seal from the 14th century. The chess (actually blue and gold) comes from the coat of arms of Count Heinrich II. Von Sponheim-Bolanden (Grafschaft Sponheim), who in 1368 obtained town rights from Emperor Charles IV in 1368. The boar is reminiscent of the Counts of Eberstein, former masters of Stauf Castle, who temporarily held local authority.

Twin towns and sister cities
  Municipality Ritten, South Tyrol, Italy, since April 22, 1966
  Louhans, Saône-et-Loire, France, since October 17, 1976 (A gift from the city is a stone pig (wild boar) from the coat of arms of Kirchheimbolanden which stands in front of the town hall.)
  Friendship treaty with Chernyakhovsk, Russia, Kaliningrad region, since March 2, 2002

Climate
Kirchheimbolanden has a moderate climate. It is classified as a "Cfb" (Marine West Coast Climate/Oceanic climate) by the Köppen Climate Classification system.

Sons and daughters of the city

Year up to 1900 

 Johann II of Nassau-Saarbrücken (1423–1472), nobleman
 Amelia of Nassau-Weilburg (1776–1841), Princess of Anhalt-Bernburg
 Princess Henriette of Nassau-Weilburg (1780–1857), noblewoman
 Wilhelm, Duke of Nassau (1792–1839), Duke of Nassau from 1816 to 1839
 Georg von Neumayer (1826–1909), geophysicist and polar explorer, founder and leader of the  German naval reserve .
 Eugen Wolf (1850–1912), journalist and researcher

20th century 

 David Hoffmann (* 1980), bodybuilder
 Sascha Kotysch (* 1988), soccer player
 Max Roser, economist and media critic

Gallery

See also
Verbandsgemeinde Kirchheimbolanden
Rhineland-Palatinate

References

External links

www.kirchheimbolanden.de — Official site
www.mkengel.de — Unofficial site with pictures

Donnersbergkreis
Palatinate (region)